The 2010 United States House of Representatives elections in Massachusetts were held on November 2, 2010, to determine who would represent the state of Massachusetts in the U.S. House of Representatives. Massachusetts has ten seats in the House, apportioned according to the 2000 United States Census. Representatives are elected for two-year terms; those elected will serve in the 112th Congress from January 3, 2011 until January 3, 2013. All current representatives are member of the Democratic Party and none of the ten faced major party opposition in 2008.

Overview

By district
Results of the 2010 United States House of Representatives elections in Massachusetts by district:

District 1

 covers roughly the northwest half of the state. It has been represented by Democrat John Olver since June 1991.

District 2

 lies in the south-central part of the state. It has been represented by Democrat Richard Neal since 1989.

The Republican Party nominee is Tom Wesley, who defeated Jay Fleitman in the September primary.  Democrat Neal has not faced a Republican challenger since 1996.

District 3

 lies in the central and southeastern part of the state. It has been represented by Democrat Jim McGovern since 1997.

District 4

 lies in the southern part of the state,  including the South Coast region. It has been represented by Democrat Barney Frank since 1981. CQ Politics had forecast the race as 'Safe Democrat'. Rachel Brown, famous for comparing health care reform to a Nazi in front of Frank during a 2009 Town Hall meeting, ran unsuccessfully against Frank in the Democratic primary, losing 39,974 to 10,289. Sean Bielat, a technology executive from Brookline, won the Republican primary to challenge Frank, defeating Earl Sholley, the Republican Nominee from Norfolk in 2008, by a vote of 11,797 to 7,782.

Polling

District 5

 lies in the north-east part of the state. It has been represented by Democrat Niki Tsongas since she won a special election in October 16, 2007 upon the resignation of Marty Meehan (D).

District 6

 covers the north-east corner of the state. At the time of the election it had been represented by Democrat John F. Tierney since 1997.

District 7

 lies in the eastern part of the state, including some Boston suburbs. It has been represented by Democrat Edward J. Markey since 1976.

District 8

 lies in the eastern part of the state, including part of Boston and the immediately adjacent cities of Cambridge, Somerville, and Chelsea. It has been represented by Democrat Mike Capuano since 1999.  Capuano ran unopposed.

District 9

 lies in the eastern part of the state, including part of Boston and some of its southern suburbs. It has been represented by Democrat Stephen Lynch since October 2001. CQ Politics forecasted the race as 'Safe Democrat'.

In response to Lynch's vote against health care reform, Needham selectwoman Harmony Wu announced she was considering a run against Lynch in the Democratic Primary, but announced on April 7, 2010 that she decided not to run.  On April 22 Mac D'Alessandro, the New England political director of SEIU, announced his intention to challenge Lynch. Polling has indicated that Lynch is vulnerable to such a challenge.

District 10

This was an open seat. Candidates were Democratic nominee William R. Keating, Republican nominee Jeff Perry, and Independents Maryanne Lewis and Jim Sheets.

 covers the south-east part of the state, including parts of the South Shore and all of Cape Cod and The Islands. Democrat Bill Delahunt, who has represented the seat since 1997, announced in March 2010 that he did not plan to run for re-election. The Boston Globe, on April 30, 2010, reported that Democratic State Senator Robert O'Leary would announce his candidacy for the Democratic nomination for the seat on the day following. Joseph P. Kennedy III was considered a likely Democratic contender, but he chose not to run. It was reported in the Boston Globe, that District Attorney of Norfolk County William R. Keating also sought the Democratic nomination for the seat.

Republican Joe Malone, who ran against Ted Kennedy in 1988 and served as state treasurer from 1991 to 1999, unsuccessfully ran for the seat. Republican State Representative Jeff Perry also ran. Despite a movement to draft him into running, Republican State Senator Bob Hedlund decided not to enter this race. Ray Kasperowicz of Cohasset had also filed to run as a Republican, but also lost in the primary.

Malone received a donation from US-Cuba Democracy PAC. Perry received donations from the Sandwich and Nantucket Republican Town Committees, the Cape Cod Republican Club, as well as other PACs such as the Committee to Elect Greer Swiston and the Cummings Committee.

Polling

Campaign financing 
District 1

Fundraising totals for Olver and Gunn are as of October 13, 2010. Totals for Engel are as of September 30. Source: Federal Election Commission

District 2

As of October 13, 2010. Source: Federal Election Commission

District 3

As of October 13, 2010. Source: Federal Election Commission

District 4

As of October 13, 2010. Source: Federal Election Commission

District 5

As of October 15, 2010. Source: Federal Election Commission

District 6

As of October 13, 2010. Source: Federal Election Commission

District 7

Totals for Markey are as of October 13; totals for Dembrowski are as of October September 30. Source: Federal Election Commission

District 8

As of October 13, 2010. Source: Federal Election Commission

District 9

As of October 13, 2010. Source: Federal Election Commission

District 10

As of October 13, 2010. Source: Federal Election Commission

References

External links
 Neal for Congress
 Jay Fleitman for Congress
 Tom Wesley for United States Congress

House - Massachusetts from the Cook Political Report

Local politics at The Boston Herald
MA - District 10 from OurCampaigns.com
Race ranking and details from CQ Politics
Campaign contributions from OpenSecrets
Race profile at The New York Times

United States House of Representatives
2010
Massachusetts